North Newington is a village and civil parish in northern Oxfordshire, England, about  west of Banbury. The 2011 Census recorded the parish population as 324. Sor Brook, a tributary of the River Cherwell, forms part of the eastern boundary of the parish and the B4035 road forms part of the southern boundary.

History
North Newington used to be a township in the parish of Broughton. It is still in the Church of England ecclesiastical parish of St Mary the Virgin, Broughton. North Newington's most notable historic building is Park Farm House, which has buttresses and other features from the 14th or 15th century. Park Farm has also a 17th-century circular dovecote.

Amenities
A village school was built in 1853 and is now Bishop Carpenter Church of England primary school. The school celebrated its sesquicentenary in 2003 with an open day at which it invited former pupils to return and share memories. This was combined with a Village History Day which showed how the village has developed since records began.  North Newington has a 17th-century public house, The Baker's Arms, which currently trades as the Blinking Owl. The village used to have another 17th-century pub, the Roebuck, which is now a private house.

References

Sources and further reading

External links

North Newington's Website

Villages in Oxfordshire
Civil parishes in Oxfordshire